Rothwell is a ward in the metropolitan borough of the City of Leeds, West Yorkshire, England.  It contains 40 listed buildings that are recorded in the National Heritage List for England.  Of these, four are listed at Grade II*, the middle of the three grades, and the others are at Grade II, the lowest grade.  In addition to the town of Rothwell, the parish contains the villages of Carlton, Oulton, and Woodlesford, and the surrounding area.  Most of the listed buildings are houses and cottages, farmhouses and farm buildings.  The other listed buildings include churches and a gravestone, a row of almshouses, a former poorhouse, former schools, the clock tower from a former workhouse, and a war memorial.


Key

Buildings

References

Citations

Sources

 

Lists of listed buildings in West Yorkshire